Novo Selo is a village in the municipality of Želino, North Macedonia.

Demographics
As of the 2021 census, Novo Selo had 602 residents with the following ethnic composition:
Albanians 542
Persons for whom data are taken from administrative sources 60

According to the 2002 census, the village had a total of 667 inhabitants. Ethnic groups in the village include:

Albanians 663
Bosniaks 1
Others 3

References

External links

Villages in Želino Municipality
Albanian communities in North Macedonia